Gordon Ryan (born July 8, 1995) is an American submission grappler and 1st-degree Brazilian jiu-jitsu black belt, considered by many to be the greatest no–gi grappler of all time due to his accomplishments and dominance. 
Ryan is a five–time ADCC World champion, two-time IBJJF No-Gi World champion and a four-time Eddie Bravo Invitational champion.

Early life
Gordon F Ryan III was born on July 8, 1995 in Monroe, New Jersey, USA. He began grappling at the age of 15 under Miguel Benitez before switching to train under John Danaher, Tom DeBlass and Garry Tonon. He began competing and won the IBJJF World No-Gi Brazilian Jiu-Jitsu Championship as a  brown belt.

Career

2016
After a 6-month brown belt run, where Ryan won notable tournaments such as the Newaza Challenge and the World Championship, Ryan was awarded his black belt by Garry Tonon in February 2016 in a ceremony supported by the presence of Tom deBlass, Ricardo Almeida and John Danaher – who shared the responsibility of the new belt rank.

On April 24, 2016, Ryan won the Eddie Bravo Invitational Championship, defeating world champion Yuri Simões and noted grappler Rustam Chsiev on the way. Ryan next faced top USA grappler Keenan Cornelius in a no time limit, submission only match where Ryan was able to upset Cornelius and submit him with a heel hook.

2017
In September 2017 Ryan competed at the ADCC World Championship. He took gold in the -88 kg weight category, defeating Dillon Danis, Romulo Barral, Xande Ribeiro and Keenan Cornelius. He also took 2nd place in the absolute division, submitting all his opponents on his way to losing to Felipe Pena in the final.

He would go on to win another EBI title and defeat Yuri Simões in a superfight at Kasai Pro to wrap up 2017.

2018
In September 2018, Ryan competed at the IBJJF Pan No-gi, winning both his weight class and the absolute division all by submission.  Ryan led Team Alpha Male's victory in Quintet's 2018 Tournament, Quintet 3. Ryan's submission victories against Josh Barnett and Marcos Souza saw Team Alpha Male advance to the Finals. His submission victories against Craig Jones and Vítor Ribeiro earned his team's ultimate victory in the tournament. He also competed at the IBJJF Nogi Worlds in California, again taking gold in both his weight class and the absolute division.

2019
In 2019 Gordon Ryan competed in a superfight against Joao Gabriel Rocha at KASAI Super Series in Dallas, Texas. Gordon ultimately won the match, but during an exchange there was an entanglement where Gordon was attempting an entry for a heel hook and his knee popped multiple times and tore his LCL. This injury was expected to keep him out of competition for about 6 months.

In September 2019 it was reported that Gordon injured his hand 
in a freak accident with one of his motorized bikes. The tire became flat and he decided to carry the bike on his shoulders. When he went to hoist the bike on his shoulders the throttle stuck and sucked his hand in between the tire and fender leaving him competing at ADCC with one hand heavily bandaged and injured. Despite the injury he went on to win the -99 kg division. He beat Ben Hodgkinson, Tim Spriggs, Lucas Barbosa and Vinicius Ferreira. He would then move on the absolute division where he would claim gold following victories over Pedro Marinho, Garry Tonon, Lachlan Giles and Marcus Buchecha Almeida.

2020
Ryan was forced to withdraw from a superfight set for July 31, 2020 after contracting COVID-19. On October 2, 2020, Ryan faced fellow ADCC 2019 World Champion Matheus Diniz and defeated him via Heelhook approximately halfway through a thirty-minute submission-only match.

Ryan decided late in 2020 that he would leave the New Jersey area and move to Puerto Rico with his coach, John Danaher, and several members of his team to open up their own gym. He revealed in December 2020, that the new gym had a tentative opening date of March 2021.

2021
On March 22, 2021, ONE Championship Chairman and CEO Chatri Sityodtong confirmed that Ryan had signed a contract with the promotion to compete in grappling, as well as mixed martial arts if he wished to. He was scheduled to make his promotional debut in a grappling match against multiple–times ONE Lightweight World Champion (MMA) Shinya Aoki on August 27, 2021. Ryan announced on May 21 that he was at least momentarily retiring from competitive grappling due to his long–time Gastroparesis condition, as it had worsened throughout the years, and looks forward to taking care of his health. As confirmed from sources. Gordon Ryan is no longer under One Championship contract.

In July 2021 it was announced that Danaher Death Squad had split up and Ryan will be opening his own academy in Austin, Texas.

2022
In September 2022, Gordon competed at ADCC both in the +99kg division and in the superfight against André Galvão. It was the first time in the history of ADCC that a competitor that was scheduled to do the superfight also fought at a weight division. Gordon proceeded to clear his weight class with victories over Heikki Jussila, Victor Hugo, Roosevelt Sousa and Nick Rodriguez to win gold. He also had the fastest submission in the history of ADCC against Roosevelt Sousa, where he submitted Sousa via outside heel hook in 11 seconds. Later that weekend, Ryan faced Galvão in a highly anticipated match in grappling history and won via rear naked choke. Gordon became the first grappler in ADCC history to become champion in three different weight classes and he defeated André Galvão, who had not lost a match since 2017. 

On December 15, 2022 Ryan was scheduled to compete against Vinny Magalhães in the main event of UFC Fight Pass Invitational 3. Magalhães withdrew from the event on short notice and was replaced by Ryan's former teammate Nick Rodriguez. Ryan went on to win the match by fastest escape time in EBI overtime.

2023 
In January 2023, Ryan announced that he had signed a seven-figure multi-fight contract with FloSports.

The tetralogy bout between Ryan and Felipe Pena was originally scheduled on February 25, 2023, at Who's Number One. Just two days before the event, Ryan withdrew as a result of stomach issues that he suffered during the week leading up to the match and he was replaced by Nick Rodriguez.

Personal life 
Ryan is the older brother of Nicky Ryan, another successful submission grappler.

He is in a relationship with Nathalia Santoro, one of his training partners and a BJJ brown belt under John Danaher.

Stomach condition 
Ryan reported suffering from an undiagnosed stomach condition for several years until April 2019, when he was finally diagnosed with Helicobacter pylori.

Controversy 
Ryan has engaged in numerous public spats with other competitive grapplers, including an incident on October 13, 2020, when he revealed private conversations between himself and Felipe Pena regarding a potential third match between the pair. Shortly after this, on November 29, 2020, he also accused fellow ADCC 2019 medalist Lachlan Giles of using PEDs after the latter shared his opinion that those who have won medals while using PEDs should relinquish those titles. In January, 2021, Ryan also clashed with several key members of ATOS on social media, including founder and head coach Andre Galvao, ahead of their potential match at ADCC 2022.

After his teammate Craig Jones defeated ATOS representative Ronaldo Junior at Who's Number One on February 26, 2021, Ryan attempted to shake hands with André Galvão but was sworn at and given the middle finger in return by Galvão. Galvão then confronted Ryan backstage and footage emerged of the two exchanging heated words. Galvão shoved Ryan, In return Ryan slapped Galvão twice and several of the event's competitors and staff intervened to calm the situation down. The public statement issued by Ryan after the incident expressed no remorse for it and instead, he chose to use the opportunity to direct further criticism towards both André Galvão and several members of the ATOS team.

Another incident involved him making what appeared to be sexual comments towards the young daughter of Erbeth Santos, after Santos had made comments regarding both Ryan’s father and suggestive sexual comments toward his girlfriend. He has also been known for publicly challenging other Brazilian Jiu-Jitsu competitors by criticizing their ability, like AJ Agazarm and Dillon Danis.

Ryan is well known for claiming that other elite grapplers are unwilling to face him and at least one of them, Felipe Pena, has publicly claimed that this is a lie and in fact it is Ryan who refuses to compete against them instead.

Gordon Ryan has generated controversy for his social media activity which included potentially insensitive commentary on homeless individuals and garnered allegations of racism and xenophobia.

Championships and accomplishments

2022
  Jitsmagazine BJJ Awards 'Male Grappler of the Year (No Gi)
  Fight Pass Invitational 3 (Superfight)
  ADCC 2022 World Championship (Superfight)
  ADCC 2022 World Championship (+99 kg)
  Best Athlete at ADCC 2022 World Championship
  Fastest Submission at ADCC 2022 World Championship
  Who's Number One (Superfight)
  Who's Number One (Superfight)
  Who's Number One (Superfight)
2021
  Who's Number One (Superfight)
  Who's Number One (Superfight)
2020
  Third Coast Grappling: Kumite IV (Superfight)
  Who's Number One (Superfight)
  Grappling Industries: Arnold Classic (Absolute)
  BJJ Fanatics (Superfight)
  Sub Stars (Superfight)
2019
  Submission Underground 10 (Superfight)
  Quintet Ultra (Superfight)
  Third Coast Grappling 3 (Superfight)
  World Jiu-Jitsu Festival (Superfight)
  ADCC 2019 World Championship (Absolute)
  ADCC 2019 World Championship (–99 kg)
  Kinektic 1 (with Team BJJ Fanatics)
  Kasai Super Series 1 (Superfight)
2018
  IBJJF Nogi World Championships (Black Belt Absolute)
  IBJJF Nogi World Championships (Black Belt +97.5 kg)
  Quintet 3 (with Team Alpha Male)
  IBJJF Pan Nogi (Black Belt Absolute)
  IBJJF Pan Nogi (Black Belt +97.5 kg)
2017
  Kasai Pro (Superfight)
  Eddie Bravo Invitational 14 (Absolute)
  Metamoris 8 (Superfight)
  ADCC 2017 World Championship (Absolute)
  ADCC 2017 World Championship (–88 kg)
  Grappling Industries (Absolute)
  Fight2Win 34 (Superfight)
  Fight2Win 30 (Superfight)
  Eddie Bravo Invitational 11 (–170 lbs)
  Submission Underground 3 (Superfight)
  Sapteiro 6 (Absolute)
2016
  Sapteiro 5 (Superfight)
  Eddie Bravo Invitational 8 (–185 lbs)
  Grappling Industries (Superfight)
  Eddie Bravo Invitational 6 (Absolute)
  Portland Sunday Open (Absolute)
  Onnit Invitational 2 (Superfight)
  Goodfight Pro 2 (–77 kg)
  Sapteiro 1 (Absolute)
  Grappling Industries Montreal (Absolute)
2015
  Goodfight All-Star (–170 lbs)
  IBJJF Nogi World Championships (Brown Belt –73.5 kg)
  United Grappling Association: Fall Open (Superfight)
  Newaza Challenge (Absolute)
  United Grappling Association: Summer Open (Superfight)
  Grapplers Quest: All-Star (–185 lbs)
  Kumite Classic (Absolute)
  Kumite Classic (–185 lbs)
  ADCC North American Championship (–88 kg)
  NAGA World Championship (Gi Purple Belt –170 lbs)
  NAGA World Championship (Expert Nogi –170 lbs)
  United Grappling Association: Spring Open (Superfight)
2014
  ADCC North American Championship (–88 kg)
  PGL XI (Superfight)
  PGL IV (–155 lbs)
2013
  AGL 4 (Absolute)
  AGL 4 (–155 lbs)
  AGL 3 (Superfight)
2012
  Grapplers Quest: World Championship (Beginner –160 lbs)
  Grapplers Quest: Beast from the East (Teen Gi –170 lbs)
  Grapplers Quest: Beast from the East (Teen Nogi –170 lbs)
2011
  Grapplers Quest: World Championship (Teen –170 lbs)

Submission grappling record

Freestyle wrestling results

! colspan="7"| Freestyle Matches
|-
!  Res.
!  Record
!  Opponent
!  Score
!  Date
!  Event
!  Location
|-
|Loss
|0–1
|align=left| Pat Downey
|style="font-size:88%"|TF 0–11
|style="font-size:88%"|February 29, 2020
|style="font-size:88%"|2020 BJJ Fanatics Grand Prix
|style="text-align:left;font-size:88%;" |
 Beverly, Massachusetts

Instructional DVDs

Notes

References

External links
Gordon Ryan BJJ Heroes Profile
Gordon Ryan Homepage
Gordon Ryan FloGrappling Profile

American practitioners of Brazilian jiu-jitsu
Living people
People awarded a black belt in Brazilian jiu-jitsu
American submission wrestlers
1995 births
World No-Gi Brazilian Jiu-Jitsu Championship medalists
ADCC Submission Fighting World Champions (men)